Midway is an unincorporated community in Concord Township, Elkhart County, Indiana.

Geography

References

Unincorporated communities in Elkhart County, Indiana
Unincorporated communities in Indiana